The Llangollen Advertiser, Denbighshire, Merionethshire and North Wales Journal  was a weekly English-language newspaper that circulated in Denbighshire, Merionethshire, and North Wales. It was first published on 2 November 1860.

Welsh Newspapers Online has digitised 2,311 issues of the Llangollen Advertiser (1868–1919) from the newspaper holdings of the National Library of Wales.

References

Newspapers published in Wales
Publications established in 1860
1860 establishments in Wales